Gazan typically refers to a resident of the Gaza Strip. It may also refer to:

 Gazan, Natanz, a village in Isfahan Province, Iran
 Gazan, Semirom, a village in Isfahan Province, Iran
 Gazan, Kermanshah, a village in Kermanshah Province, Iran
 Gazan-e Olya, a village in Kurdistan Province
 Gazan-e Sofla, a village in Kurdistan Province
 Gazan, Sistan and Baluchestan
 Gazan Ashehi, Sistan and Baluchestan Province
 Gazan, South Khorasan, a village in South Khorasan Province, Iran
 Gazan, alternate name of Darreh-ye Ghazan-e Sofla, a village in South Khorasan Province, Iran
 Gazan Bazin (disambiguation), villages in Iran
 Jizan, a city in South-Western Saudi Arabia
 Honoré Théodore Maxime Gazan de la Peyrière (1765-1845), a French general during the Napoleonic Wars